"Too Much, Too Little, Too Late" is a song performed by singers Johnny Mathis and Deniece Williams. Lyrics and music were arranged by Nat Kipner and John Vallins. The single was a comeback of sorts for Mathis as his last U.S. top 10 hit was 1964's "What Will Mary Say" and his last U.S. #1 hit was 1957's "Chances Are."

Released as a single in 1978, it reached #1 on the U.S. Billboard Hot 100 pop chart, Adult Contemporary chart, and R&B chart. It also reached #1 on Record World's Single Chart, but peaked at #2 on the Cashbox Top 100. Outside the United States, the song peaked at #9 on the Canadian Singles Chart and #3 on the UK Singles Chart.

"Too Much, Too Little, Too Late" was certified gold and silver in the United States and the United Kingdom by the RIAA and the British Phonographic Industry respectively.  

Later in 1978, the duo released a follow-up single, "You're All I Need to Get By" (which peaked at #47 on the Hot 100), and a full album of duets, That's What Friends Are For. The success of the duets with Williams prompted Mathis to record duets with a variety of partners including Jane Olivor, Dionne Warwick, Natalie Cole, Gladys Knight and Nana Mouskouri. A compilation album, also called Too Much, Too Little, Too Late and released by Sony Music in 1995, featured the title track among other songs by the Mathis–Williams duo.

Chart performance

Weekly charts

Year-end charts

Silver Sun version 
English power pop band Silver Sun recorded a cover of "Too Much, Too Little, Too Late" for their album Neo Wave. It was also released as a single, reaching number 20 on the UK Singles Chart in 1998.

See also
 List of Hot 100 number-one singles of 1978 (U.S.)
 List of number-one R&B singles of 1978 (U.S.)
 List of number-one adult contemporary singles of 1978 (U.S.)

References

External links
 

1977 songs
1978 singles
Johnny Mathis songs
Deniece Williams songs
Billboard Hot 100 number-one singles
Columbia Records singles
Male–female vocal duets